Sir Edward Carter Kearsey Gonner KBE (1862 - 1922) was an English economist, Professor of Economic Science at the University of Liverpool.

Early life 
Gonner was born on 5 March 1862 in Mayfair, London, to Peter Kersey Gonner, a silk mercer, and Elizabeth Carter. He attended Merchant Taylors' School in London, before matriculating at Lincoln College, Oxford in 1880, graduating B.A. in 1884.

Career 
He was a lecturer for the London Extension Society, as well as for University College, Bristol. In 1891 he was appointed professor at the University of Liverpool. His works on economics included Common Land and Inclosure (1912). He was made CBE in 1918 and KBE in 1921.

References

1862 births
1922 deaths
English economists
Academics of the University of Liverpool
Alumni of Lincoln College, Oxford
Academics of University College Bristol
Place of birth missing
Commanders of the Order of the British Empire
Knights Commander of the Order of the British Empire